Fa'amoetauloa Lealaiauloto Taito Dr. Faale Tumaali'i (~1949 - 16 September 2019) was a Samoan politician and Cabinet Minister. He were a member of the Human Rights Protection Party.

Tumaali'i studied for a bachelor's degree in Fiji, and then for a master's degree and PhD at the University of New South Wales. He worked for the Ministry of Agriculture, the New South Wales Agricultural Research Institute, the Australian Defence Science and Technology Organisation, as a lecturer at the University of Newcastle in Australia. After returning to Samoa in 2006 he became director of the Science Research Organisation of Samoa.

He was elected to the Legislative Assembly of Samoa at the 2011 Samoan general election, and appointed Minister of Natural Resources and Environment. He lost his seat in the 2016 election.

References

Members of the Legislative Assembly of Samoa
Human Rights Protection Party politicians
Government ministers of Samoa
University of New South Wales alumni
2019 deaths
Year of birth uncertain